The 1957–58 Challenge Cup was the 57th staging of rugby league's oldest knockout competition, the Challenge Cup.

The final was contested by Wigan and Workington Town at Wembley Stadium in London.

The final was played on Saturday 10 May 1958, where Wigan beat Workington 13–9 in front of a crowd of 66,109.

The Lance Todd Trophy was awarded to Wigan  Rees Thomas.

First round

Second round

Quarterfinals

Semifinals

Final

References

External links
Challenge Cup official website 
Challenge Cup 1957/58 results at Rugby League Project

Challenge Cup
Challenge Cup